Sphagnum macrophyllum, the largeleaf sphagnum, is a species of peat moss native to southern and eastern North America. It is known from every state from Texas to New Jersey as well as New York, and the Canadian provinces of Nova Scotia and Newfoundland. It can be found floating on lakes and ponds.

Sphagnum macrophyllum has fronds that are dark brown to almost black. Leaves are lanceolate, tapering at the tip.

References

macrophyllum
Flora of the United States
Flora of Nova Scotia
Flora of Newfoundland
Flora without expected TNC conservation status